The Brigitte Bardot Foundation (in French: Fondation Brigitte Bardot - FBB) is a French foundation dedicated to animal protection created by French actress Brigitte Bardot in 1986. Since 1992, the foundation has been recognized as a "public utility" (French: Déclaration d'utilité publique).

History 
Bardot's initial involvement with animal rights was in 1962, after seeing photographs of the conditions in which animals were killed. Upon this, Bardot immediately began advocating against the use of painful electric shock pistols in slaughterhouses, and became a vegetarian. In 1967, Bardot was received at the Élysée Palace where she met with Charles de Gaulle, the then president of France. It was a few years later that Bardot obtained the "stunning before slaughter" rights from the government.

In 1977, Bardot went on to campaign against the hunting of baby Harp seals. Upon invitation from Paul Watson, of the Sea Shepherd Conservation Society, Bardot embarked on a five day trip to the ice fields in Blanc-Sablon, Canada, receiving significant media attention. In addition, the trip also gained Bardot the support of French president, Valéry Giscard d'Estaing, leading to changes regarding the import of seal products.

The Brigitte Bardot Foundation (La Fondation Brigitte Bardot) was launched by Bardot in Saint-Tropez, in 1986 where she auctioned her jewellery and other personal possessions to raise 3 million French francs for her campaigns and activities.

In 1988, the organization moved to Paris. It was here that Bardot led a television series entitled S.O.S. Animaux. The show aired from 1989 through 1992, over which time it spread its purpose of influencing public opinion of animal cruelty.

In 1991, Bardot donated her Saint Tropez property, La Madrague to the foundation so as to raise the capital required to obtain a declaration of public utility. The declaration was granted on 21 February 1992, by the Conseil d'État.

In 1995, the Dalai Lama became an honorary member of the foundation.

The Foundation celebrated its 20th anniversary in 2006. It reached 75,000 members by the year 2014.

Activities 
The foundation has helped create shelters for elephants in South Africa, koalas in Australia, dancing bears in Bulgaria, and primates in Cameroon. It has also reintroduced several animal species that had completely disappeared in Senegal and participated in the reintroduction of wolves to the Alps. A mobile veterinary clinic has also been created for the Eastern Bloc countries.

The foundation is a regular plaintiff in lawsuits against animal cruelty. In January 2016, to support the proposition of a law to ban force-feeding on ducks and geese, the foundation invited Pamela Anderson to speak at the French National Assembly.

While funding other French animal shelters, the foundation has also created its own shelter, La Mare Anzou, located in a ruined mansion in the department of Eure in Normandy. It covers several hectares, where 200 dogs and 250 cats wait for adoption. This shelter is also a "retirement home" for several horses, cows, etc. After complaints from local residents about noise nuisance threatened to close the shelter in 2009, the foundation began soundproofing construction, investing 3 million euros to date.

On 23 December 2006, Brigitte Bardot published a letter to Nicolas Sarkozy in the Foundation's newsletter, L'info-journal (published every trimester since 1992), condemning the practice of the Eid al-Adha in France. This caused her be charged with and later fined for incitement to racial hatred.

In 2009, the foundation launched a campaign against hippophagy titled Le cheval vous l'aimez comment? ( "The horse, how do you like it?"). The foundation was banned from the Salon du Cheval (Paris Horse Show), the organizers of the event stating, "This is not a place to develop a view point on hippophagy". In the winter of this year, the foundation launched Fourrure : signe extérieur de cruauté ("Fur : external sign of cruelty"), a national campaign of posters and television spots against fur. The French fur association attempted to ban these advertisements, without success. In December 2005, a new communication campaign Fourrure, le look qui tue ("Fur, the look that kills") was launched in France. The foundation has also supported the yearly "day without fur," on every first Saturday of winter sales since 2007.

In 2011, the boat "MV Brigitte Bardot," co-financed by the foundation and the Sea Shepherd Conservation Society of Paul Watson, was damaged by a wave. It was repaired and put back on the water the next year. In 2015, it was exhibited in Paris after a campaign in the Faroe Islands to save the cetaceans.

See also 
Brigitte Bardot
Animal rights
Animal welfare

References

External links 
Official website 

Animal welfare organizations based in France
Organizations established in 1986
Brigitte Bardot
Organizations based in Paris